Erdman Penner (January 17, 1905 - November 10, 1956) was a Canadian screenwriter and producer, known for his work with Walt Disney, including writing the screenplays for Cinderella, Sleeping Beauty, Lady and the Tramp among others.

Life and career 
Penner was born into a Mennonite family in Rosthern, Saskatchewan in 1905 to Dr. Erdman Penner (1873–1960) and Blanche Penner (1880–1962). Penner studied at the University of Saskatchewan, American Academy of Art in Chicago and the American School for Writers in Hollywood. He was hired by Walt Disney Productions in 1935, where he wrote and adapted stories for Pinocchio, Fantasia, Cinderella, Alice in Wonderland and others. He also wrote song lyrics for Peter Pan and was an associate producer on Lady and the Tramp. He died on November 10, 1956 in Los Angeles, California, USA.

References

1905 births
1956 deaths
20th-century Canadian male writers
20th-century Canadian screenwriters
Canadian male screenwriters
Mennonite writers
Canadian Mennonites
Writers from Saskatchewan
Walt Disney Animation Studios people
Canadian expatriates in the United States